John Richard Whent (3 May 1920 – 25 August 1999) was an English professional soccer player who made 113 English Football League appearances playing at centre half or wing half for Brighton & Hove Albion and Luton Town. He won two Canadian Championships, with Vancouver St Andrew's in 1947 and the Westminster Royals six years later

Life and career
Whent was born in England, in Darlington, County Durham, and emigrated to Canada at a young age. He also lived in California, playing football for Olympic Club and San Francisco Rovers, before returning to Vancouver where he played for St Saviour's. He served in the Canadian Army during the Second World War, played football as a guest for Tottenham Hotspur, and when he was posted to the Brighton area, signed amateur forms with Brighton & Hove Albion and represented them in the 1945–46 FA Cup. When the war was over, he returned to Canada where he was a member of the 1946–47 Pacific Coast League-winning Vancouver St Andrew's team who in 1987 were inducted into the British Columbia Sports Hall of Fame.

Whent was tempted back to Brighton in 1947, and signed for the club on professional terms. He played regularly, mainly at centre half, and also captained the team as he went on to make 101 appearances in the Football League Third Division South. He moved on to Second Division club Luton Town ahead of the 1950–51 season, as part of the deal that took Jimmy Mulvaney and Peter Walsh to Brighton, but played little. After two seasons with Kettering Town of the Southern League, he returned to Canada where he won his first Challenge Trophy in 1953 with the Westminster Royals. In 1950, Whent was on a 16-man shortlist in a 1950 Canadian Press poll to select the best players of the previous 50 years.

Whent rejoined the Pacific Coast League for the 1953–54 and 1954–55 seasons with the New Westminster Royals. In the fall of 1953, he helped the Royals captured the 1953 Canadian championship.

By 1958, Whent was back in San Francisco playing for an all-star team against a touring Manchester City side. He died in Citrus Heights, California, in 1999 at the age of 79. He was playing for the San Francisco Mercuries as late as 1961.

References

External links
 / Canada Soccer Hall of Fame

1920 births
1999 deaths
Footballers from Darlington
English footballers
Canadian soccer players
Association football midfielders
Brighton & Hove Albion F.C. players
Luton Town F.C. players
Kettering Town F.C. players
Westminster Royals (soccer) players
English Football League players
Southern Football League players
Tottenham Hotspur F.C. wartime guest players
Canadian expatriate soccer players
Canadian expatriate sportspeople in England
English expatriate sportspeople in Canada
Expatriate soccer players in Canada
English expatriate footballers
Canadian Army personnel of World War II